"La veuve Boivin" (1704 – 13 February 1776) real name Élisabeth Catherine Boivin, widow of François Boivin and Jean-Christophe Ballard's daughter, was an 18th-century French music publisher in Paris.

The music publishing house was founded in 1721 by François Boivin (circa 1693-1733) and his uncle, Michel Pignolet de Montéclair. It was located rue Saint-Honoré, under the banner "À la Règle d’Or" (at the Golden Rule). At the death of François Boivin, his widow took over the management of the company.

Her mark was found on many scores published and sold in Paris until 1753 when she sold her business to Marc Bayard, another music publisher. She died in Chartres in 1776.

References

Sources

See also
List of women music publishers before 1900

External links
Information about Boivin at IMSLP

French music publishers (people)
Publishers (people) from Paris
1704 births
1776 deaths